Paul Baier (born February 2, 1985) is an American former professional ice hockey defenseman who mainly played in the American Hockey League (AHL).

Playing career
Baier was drafted in the third round, 95th overall, by the Los Angeles Kings in the 2004 NHL Entry Draft. Prior to playing professional hockey, Baier attended Brown University.

Unsigned from the Kings he participated in the Buffalo Sabres training camp prior to the 2008–09 season before he was released to AHL affiliate, the Portland Pirates. Following his first full professional season with the Pirates Baier was invited to the Ottawa Senators training camp on September 12, 2009, and played the 2009–10 season with AHL affiliate, the Binghamton Senators.

The following season Baier returned to the Rochester Americans, signing a one-year contract on September 14, 2010.

Baier became a free agent for the 2011–12 season, and was signed by the Hershey Bears to a one-year AHL contract in July 2011. Subsequently, the Washington Capitals invited him to their training camp in September 2011.

However, Baier began the 2011–12 season with the Capitals' and Bears' ECHL affiliate the South Carolina Stingrays. On January 24, 2012, with only two games with the Hershey Bears, Baier was mutually released from his contract and immediately joined the Italian Serie A for the remainder of the year.

On July 29, 2013, he was signed to a one-year deal, alongside his younger brother Eric, as a free agent with the Orlando Solar Bears of the ECHL. After just 12 games with the Solar Bears, Baier announced his retirement midseason on January 23, 2014.

Career statistics

References

External links

1985 births
American expatriate sportspeople in Italy
American men's ice hockey defensemen
Binghamton Senators players
Brown Bears men's ice hockey players
SG Cortina players
Hershey Bears players
Ice hockey players from New Jersey
Living people
Los Angeles Kings draft picks
Orlando Solar Bears (ECHL) players
Sportspeople from Summit, New Jersey
Portland Pirates players
Rochester Americans players
South Carolina Stingrays players
HC Valpellice players